Alex Pyecroft (born 4 September 1992) is an Australian cricketer. He made his first-class debut for Tasmania in the 2018–19 Sheffield Shield season on 27 November 2018. As well as being a player, Pyecroft is also the Female Pathway Coach of the Hobart Hurricanes in the Women's Big Bash League (WBBL).

References

External links
 

1992 births
Living people
Australian cricketers
Place of birth missing (living people)
Tasmania cricketers